"White Sky" is the fourth single from Vampire Weekend's second album Contra. The single release features three remixes of the song by Basement Jaxx. It is also the first song to be written on Contra, dating back before their debut album was released.

Production and composition
Band keyboardist Rostam Batmanglij made a 30-second loop on his computer, and Ezra Koenig kept listening to it at his home until he came up with the melody for it.

While Koenig considered Contra to be "something of a Californian album", "White Sky" deals with someone exploring New York and its residents.

Track listing
Digital EP
"White Sky" - 2:58
"White Sky" (Basement Jaxx Club Mix) - 6:43
"White Sky" (Basement Jaxx Warp Dub Mix) - 5:13
"White Sky" (Basement Jaxx Vamp Dub Mix) - 3:57

Digital Remixes EP
"White Sky" - 2:58
"White Sky" (Cécile Remix) - 6:41
"White Sky" (New Look Remix) - 2:51
"White Sky" (Basement Jaxx Club Mix) - 6:42

Personnel
Vampire Weekend
 Ezra Koenig – lead vocals, guitar
 Rostam Batmanglij – piano, background vocals, vocal harmonies, keyboards, harpsichord, VSS-30, drum, synth, sampler programming, guitar
 Christopher Tomson – drums
 Chris Baio – bass, background vocals

Technical
 Rostam Batmanglij – mixing, engineering
 Shane Stoneback – mixing assistance, engineering
 Justin Gerrish – engineering
 Fernando Lodeiro – engineering assistance
 Emily Lazar – mastering
 Joe LaPorta – assistant mastering engineering

Accolades

Chart positions

References

2010 singles
Vampire Weekend songs
2010 songs
XL Recordings singles
Songs written by Chris Baio
Songs written by Ezra Koenig
Songs written by Chris Tomson
Songs written by Rostam Batmanglij